The Colorado Mammoth are a lacrosse team based in Denver, Colorado playing in the National Lacrosse League (NLL). The 2016 season was the 30th in franchise history and 14th as the Mammoth (previously the Washington Power, Pittsburgh Crossefire, and Baltimore Thunder).

Final standings

Game log

Regular season

Playoffs

Roster

Transactions

Entry Draft
The 2015 NLL Entry Draft took place on September 28, 2015. The Mammoth made the following selections:

See also
2016 NLL season

References

Colorado
Colorado Mammoth seasons
Colorado Mammoth